In Indian, Pakistani and Bangladeshi cities, the Small Causes Court is responsible for adjudicating matters related to civil cases. The court is responsible for cases relating to tax, (family matters are not dealt by small causes court), property disputes (which relate to rent and leave and licence) and other such cases. In Mumbai there are two courts, the main one being in the Dhobitalao region of South Mumbai and the other in Bandra. In Kolkata, the Presidency Small Causes  Courts fulfills the same function. Bangalore these courts are housed in a place popularly known as Cauvery Bhavan near State Bank of Mysore circle, close to Avenue Road. In Pakistan, Karachi has a Court of Small Causes to adjudicate Rent & Eviction matters. So do the Small Causes Courts of Dhaka, Khulna and Chittagong in Bangladesh.

In India, Court of Small causes are established under the Presidency Small Cause
Courts Act-1882. As per the Act, The State Government may, by order in writing, establish a Court of
Small Causes at any place within its territory. Also, these courts decide only civil cases of small value in a summary manner. High
Court possesses a power of revision on the judgements of Small Causes courts.

See also 
 Bombay High Court
 Sessions Court

Judiciary of India
1882 establishments in India
Courts and tribunals established in 1882